Hermanator or Herminator may refer to:

 Herman Cain, U.S. businessman and politician
 Hermann Maier, Austrian alpine skier
 Herman Ene-Purcell, Australian boxer
 "The Hermanator" (TV episode), season 1 episode 9 of RoboCop: Alpha Commando
 "The Herminator" (TV episode), season 1 episode 6 of Herman's Head, see List of Herman's Head episodes

See also
 Terminator (disambiguation)
 Herman (disambiguation)